Squeeze is the fourth studio album by singer Fiona, released in 1992 through Geffen Records.

Track listing

Personnel

Fiona – lead vocals
Dave Marshall – guitar, backing vocals
Tommy Girvin – guitar
Craig Stull – steel guitar
Kim Bullard – keyboard
Jimmy DeGrasso – drums, percussion, backing vocals
Laura McDonald – bass, backing vocals
Robert O. Ragland – strings arrangement, conducting
Scott Douglas MacLachlan, Don Dokken, Joey Tempest – backing vocals
Technical
David Thoener – engineering, mixing
Paul Winger – engineering
Scott Ralston – engineering
Dale Kawashima – engineering
Marty Horenburg – engineering
Phil Kaffel – engineering
Dan Hersch – mastering
David Donnelly – mastering
Marc Tanner – production
Guy Roche – production (track 7)
Richie Zito – production (track 7)

References

Fiona (singer) albums
1992 albums
Geffen Records albums